Tommy Burke (born 1943) is an Irish retired Gaelic footballer who played as a right corner-forward for the Cork senior football team.

Born in Millstreet, County Cork, Burke first played competitive football in his youth. He arrived on the inter-county scene at the age of seventeen when he first linked up with the Cork minor team, before later joining the under-21 side. He joined the senior panel during the 1965 championship and enjoyed a brief one-year inter-county career.

At club level Burke is a one-time junior championship medallist with Millstreet.

Honours

Team

Millstreet
Cork Junior Football Championship (1): 1963

Cork
Munster Under-21 Football Championship (1): 1963 (sub)
All-Ireland Minor Football Championship (1): 1961
Munster Minor Football Championship (2): 1960 (sub), 1961

References

1943 births
Living people
Millstreet Gaelic footballers
Cork inter-county Gaelic footballers